Korukan (also Romanized as Korūkān, Kerookan, and Kerūkān) is a village in Siyahu Rural District, Fin District, Bandar Abbas County, Hormozgan Province, Iran. At the 2006 census, its population was 68, in 24 families.

References 

Populated places in Bandar Abbas County